The Tonga national rugby league team represents Tonga in rugby league football. They are currently the second ranked team in the world. The team was formed to compete in the 1986 Pacific Cup, and have competed at six Rugby League World Cups, starting in 1995 and continuing consecutively until the most recent tournament. Their best result was at the 2017 Rugby League World Cup, where they were semi-finalists.

Formerly administered by the Tonga National Rugby League, the team is now in a state of limbo with administration. They wear a predominantly red uniform with white sides and are associated with the phrase Mate Ma'a Tonga (English: Die for Tonga). They are coached by Australian Kristian Woolf, and co-captained by Sio Siua Taukeiaho and Jason Taumalolo.

History

Rugby league first gained attention in Tonga when the Pacific Cup was partially held in the country during 1986. After this initial exposure to the Tongan people several clubs began to form or switch from rugby union to rugby league and by 1988 the nation had enough depth in their player pool to begin playing national fixtures and entered the 1988 Pacific Cup competition held in Apia, Samoa. During that Pacific Cup the Tongans played in three fixtures winning a sole match while losing the other two, with their first international victory coming against the American Samoa side a match that ended 38–14.

Over the next two years the national side sporadically played international fixtures but it was not until the 1992 Pacific Cup when they again began playing with some regularity. This run of victories earned them a place in the final of the 1992 Pacific Cup against the Western Samoan side but they eventually lost a close fought match by four points 18–14. The following tournament two years later saw the Tongan side show further improvement with several comfortable victories again earning them a spot in final of the Pacific Cup this time against the Fijians who had never defeated the Tongans at that time. The Mate Ma'a were again victorious over Fiji 34–11 and claimed their maiden Pacific Cup title.

They narrowly lost to the New Zealand team by a single point and earned a draw against Papua New Guinea.

Prior to appearing at the 2000 competition the Tongans arranged a friendly fixture against the New Zealand side but lost 74–0.

Tonga faced South Africa in their first match of the tournament where they won 66–18, however they lost to both France and Papua New Guinea meaning the Tongans again failed to make it past the first stage of the tournament.

The Pacific Cup saw the Tongans again qualify for the tournament final with victories over both the Cook Islands and Fiji but the side suffered defeat at the hands of neighbouring Samoa 51–18. 2006 saw the Tongan side re-enter the Pacific Cup where again they performed strongly qualifying for their second consecutive final where this time they reversed their previous effort with a strong victory over Fiji 22–4 giving them their second Pacific Cup title. 2006 continued to be a busy year of international fixtures for the Tongans which saw them gain qualification into the 2008 World Cup after they finished top of their Pacific group ahead of the Cook Islands, Fiji and Samoa and then defeat the Samoans 18–10 in the qualifying final. They also entered the inaugural Federation Shield competition along with England, France and Samoa and eventually finish second. England to face Tonga in League final to the English in the final 32–14 after they had defeated both France and Samoa.

2013 Pacific Rugby League Test

The International was created as a World Cup warm-up match. Tonga beat Toa Samoans by 36–4.

2013 Rugby League World Cup campaign

Tonga automatically qualified for the 2013 Rugby League World Cup after participating in the 2008 tournament. They took on 
In their first match they took on 'the Scots'. It was a tight and intense rugby league battle, but Scotland won 26–24. Tonga then went on and beat 'the Kukis', 22–16, and Italy, 16–0, but it wasn't enough. Scotland finished the group stage unbeaten, sealing their place in the quarter-final and ending Tonga's World Cup campaign in the process.

2015 Pacific Rugby League Test

The International was part of a triple header which also included the Melanesian Cup, between Papua New Guinea and Fiji, and the Junior Kangaroos against the Junior Kiwis. Samoa beat Mate Ma'a Tonga to win the Polynesian Cup by 18–16.

2017 Rugby League World Cup qualifying

After a tight first half, Mate Ma'a Tonga went on win the match scoring 16 points within the last 20 minutes of the game.

2016 Pacific Rugby League Test

The International was part of a triple header which also included the Melanesian Cup, between Papua New Guinea and Fiji, and the Junior Kangaroos against the Junior Kiwis. The match resulted in a 12-point defeat to Samoa in the 2016 Polynesian Cup.

2017 World Cup and best win in Tongan history

At the time, they were considered to be among the best forwards in the world. Both players cited a desire to honour family and strengthen the Tongan team as motivating factors for their defections, while Taumalolo's relationship with Tonga head coach Kristian Woolf was also acknowledged.

In addition, Manu Maʻu declined a likely position in the New Zealand squad, while David Fusitu'a, Solomone Kata, Tuimoala Lolohea, and Sio Siua Taukeiaho dismissed any possibility of a New Zealand re-call in order to represent Tonga. Michael Jennings also committed himself to Tonga after declining an opportunity to represent .

Tonga quickly became the most heavily backed team in the World Cup, dropping from $81 odds to $17. Entering into the tournament as the 11th ranked team in the world, Tonga comfortably won their opening two group matches, outclassing  50–4 and  32–18. In their third and final group match, Tonga upset New Zealand 28–22 after trailing 16–2 at half-time. This marked the first time since the introduction of the tiered-nation system that a tier-two team defeated a tier-one team, and the first time since  defeated  18–16 in 1995 if applied retroactively. Tonga beat  24–22 in a hard-fought quarter-final, and then lost 18–20 to England in the semi-final. England were leading 20–0 with 8 minutes remaining until Tonga scored three tries in quick succession, however, a contentious refereeing decision in the last seconds of the game denied them scoring a fourth try and progressing to the World Cup final.

After Tonga's semi-final against England, which was attended by King Tupou VI, 29 November 2018 was declared a public holiday in Tonga as Mate Ma'a Tonga Day and the entire Tongan squad was invited to the Royal Palace. Every player was honoured as Knight Commander of the Most Illustrious Order of Queen Sālote Tupou III for their contribution to sports. At the conclusion of the tournament, Tonga jumped to 4th in the RLIF world rankings.

After the tournament, several players publicly reaffirmed their allegiance to the Tongan team as the media speculated whether they would return to their tier-one nations, assuming they were to be welcomed back. Addin Fonua-Blake also announced his intention to represent Tonga after playing for New Zealand at the World Cup, commenting "I really enjoyed my time with the Kiwis but it just didn't feel like home." As a consequence, New Zealand's squad for their match against England on 24 June 2018 contained just one Tongan-eligible player, Dallin Watene-Zelezniak, who reportedly pledged his loyalty to the Kiwis to honour his great-grandfather Puti Tipene Watene, the first Māori to captain the side.

Tonga faced  for the first time ever on 20 October 2018, losing 34–16.

On 22 June 2019, Tonga faced New Zealand again at Mount Smart Stadium as part of the 2019 Oceania Cup. The Kiwis won 34–14 in a dominant display. After the NRL season ended, Tonga played against the touring  on 26 October, winning 14–6 at Waikato Stadium in Hamilton. This was Great Britain's first match after a twelve-year hiatus. The following week at Auckland's Eden Park, Tonga faced the Australia in an Oceania Cup match. Tonga stunned the world number one nation, winning 16–12, their best win in their history.

This match was labelled one of the greatest upsets in rugby league history, marking the first time Australia had lost to a tier 2 nation since 1978. Jason Taumalolo rated the win above his 2015 NRL Grand Final victory with the North Queensland Cowboys.

2021 World Cup 
Tonga competed at the 2021 Rugby League World Cup in England, having qualified automatically as semi-finalists of the 2017 tournament. The tournament was delayed until 2022 due to the COVID-19 pandemic. The team won all three group games, before falling 18-20 against Samoa in a 'classic' quarter-final that was lauded for its 'athleticism, power and superb ball-handling skills'.

Players

Current squad
The Tongan squad for the 2021 Rugby League World Cup.

Notable former players
Since rugby league was introduced to the nation of Tonga in 1986 many players of Tongan birth or heritage have gone on to attain notability by participating in NRL or Super League, or both. Additionally many Tongan heritage players have represented other nations (mainly Australia or New Zealand) in addition to Tonga.

A list of seventeen former notable Tongan heritage players below that have played in NRL & Super League all played internationally for Tonga, with twelve of them also having played for other nations.

International results

The following table underneath shows Tonga's all-time rugby league results record. Matches include those played as the Tonga Invitational XIII side. They have been participating in International fixtures since 1986.

Tonga have played 86 internationals with the most recent being played on 2 November 2019 against Australia.

†Includes matches played as Tonga Invitational.

Coaching History
Also see :Category:Tonga national rugby league team coaches.

Honours
Pacific Cup: 2
 1994, 2006

Kit supplier
Tonga's kit suppliers are ISC since 2018. Classic (1995 RLWC), Mitre (2000 RLWC), Kombat (2004–2005), KooGa (2006–2012) and FI-TA (2013–2018) were previous suppliers. As of 2019, the current kit supplier is Dynasty Sport.

See also

Tongan National Rugby League, the national league competition.
Tonga National Rugby League, the governing body of the sport in Tonga.
Rugby league in Tonga
Tonga women's national rugby league team

Notes

References

External links

2008 Rugby League World Cup Website
 Matangi Tonga Online
 Tonga Broadcasting

 
National rugby league teams
Pacific Rugby League International
Rugby league in Tonga